Miguel Coyula Aquino (born March 31, 1977, in Havana) is a Cuban filmmaker and writer. At age 17, he made his first short with a VHS camcorder, which led to his admittance to Escuela Internacional de Cine y Television (The International Film and Television School) of San Antonio de los Baños, Cuba. He won awards in his country with his short films Bailar Sobre Agujas (1999), Buena Onda, (1999), and Clase Z "Tropical" (2000). His work has always been shot on very low budgets, with his features taking several years to complete, using heavy digital manipulation in postproduction with a multi-disciplinary approach. He has been often described by critics as virtuoso and an innovator. His films often deal with alienation. They graphic depictions of sexuality and frontal criticism of politics. His depictions of Fidel Castro films have resulted in the banning of his films in Cuba, although they have also suffered censorship in Belarus, and Morocco. The controversial nature of his work often makes critics refer to him as the enfant terrible of Cuban Cinema.  

In 2000, he traveled to the United States on an invitation from the Providence Latino Film Festival. While visiting New York City, he met Anna Strasberg of the Lee Strasberg Theatre Institute and after screening his thesis film was offered a scholarship. While attending the Strasberg Institute, Coyula made his first feature, Red Cockroaches (2003), for less than $2000 over a two-year period.  The film was described by Variety as "a triumph of technology in the hands of a visionary with know-how..." The film won over twenty awards in film festivals around the world.

In 2009, Coyula was awarded the Guggenheim Fellowship by The John Simon Guggenheim Memorial Foundation for developing his second feature, the film Memories of Overdevelopment (2010), a follow-up to the Cuban classic Memorias del Subdesarrollo (1968), based on the novel by Cuban writer Edmundo Desnoes. After its world premiere at the Sundance Film Festival, the film garnered several awards and honors. The International Film Guide described it as one of the best films Cuba has produced. In 2013 La Pereza Ediciones published his first novel Mar Rojo, Mal Azul.
From 2015 to the 2016 he produced the web Series Rafael Alcides and the documentary feature Nobody (2017) which won the Best Documentary award at the Global Film Festival in Santo Domingo. His latest feature Blue Heart (2021), was filmed over ten years in Havana, premiered at the Moscow International Film Festival and won the Hollywood Foreign Press Association award at the Guadalajara International Film Festival. Cineaste described the film as "...the culminating point of Coyula´s artistic growth. It stands as his most visceral experience..." 

His second novel, La Isla Vertical was published in 2022 by Ediciones Deslinde in Madrid.

Filmography

 Pirámide (1996)
 Válvula de luz (1997)
 Detalles (1998)
 Idea (1998)
 Buena Onda (Nice Going) (1999)
 Bailar sobre agujas (Dancing on Needles) (1999)
 Clase Z "Tropical" (2000)
 El Tenedor plástico (The Plastic Fork) (2001)
 Red Cockroaches (2003)
 Memorias del Desarrollo (aka Memories of Overdevelopment) (2010)
 Nadie (Nobody) (2017)
 Corazon Azul (aka Blue Heart) (2021)

Books

 Mar rojo, mal azul (2013)
 La isla vertical (2022)

Awards and nominations

Blue Heart
 HFFP Jorge Camara Award for Best Latinamerican Film, Guadalajara International Film Festival, Mexico, 2022
 Nominated for the Golden St.George Award, Moscow International Film Festival, Russia, 2021

Memories of Overdevelopment
Memorias del Desarrollo has won 20 awards, including:
 Audience award for Best Foreign Film, Mostra Principal, Arraial CineFest, Brasil, 2012 
 Best Director of Latinamerican Section, Málaga Film Festival, Spain 2011 
 Best Film, Muestra Nacional de Nuevos Realizadores, Cuba, 2011
 Special Award, Premios ACE, USA, 2011
 Cine Latino Award, Washington DC Independent Film Festival, USA, 2011
 Most Innovative, Cero Latitud Film Festival, Ecuador, 2010
 Best Narrative Feature, Dallas Video Fest, USA, 2010
 Best Feature, New Media Film Festival, USA 2010
 Special Mention, Cine Las Americas International Film Festival, USA, 2010
 Best Film, Havana Film Festival New York, USA, 2010

Red Cockroaches
Red Cockroaches has won 23 awards, including:
 Best Editing, Fearless Tales Genre Festival, USA, 2005
 GreenCine Online Film Festival, New Media Film Festival, USA, 2005
 Best Film, Microcinema Festival, USA, 2004
 Special Jury Award, Muestra de Jóvenes Realizadores, Cuba, 2004
 Gran Premio Plaza, Festival Cineplaza, Cuba 2004.
 Special Mention for Visual Concept, Buenos Aires Rojo Sangre, Argentina,  2004
 Best Editing, Encuentro Nacional de Video, Cuba,  2004
 Special Mention, Festival Internazionale de la Fantascienza, Italy, 2004.
 Best Feature, Festival Almacén de la Imagen, Cuba, 2003

Clase Z "Tropical"
Clase Z "Tropical" is a short has won 9 awards, including:
 Best Experimental Video, Encuentro Nacional de Video, Cuba 2001
 FIPRESCI Award, Festival Almacén de la Imagen, Cuba 2000

See also

Cinema of Cuba

References

External links

 
 Millimeter Magazine's Profile on Miguel Coyula
 Review of Blue Heart at The Film Veredict
 Miguel Coyula's profile at Cineaste Magazine

1977 births
Living people
People from Havana
Cuban film directors
Cuban writers